A list of political parties, organizations, and movements adhering to various forms of fascist ideology, part of the list of fascist movements by country.

Fascist movements, sorted by country
Overview A-F G-M N-T U-Z

Overview A-F G-M N-T U-Z

References

 U-Z